Donald Allen Bailey (July 21, 1945 – March 9, 2020) was an American lawyer and politician from Pennsylvania. He was a Democratic member of the United States House of Representatives from 1979 to 1983, Auditor General of Pennsylvania from 1985 to 1989, and a candidate for the Democratic nomination for United States Senate and Governor of Pennsylvania. His Congressional District (PA-21) included all of Westmoreland County, Pennsylvania with a sliver of Allegheny County, Pennsylvania, prior to the 1981 redistricting.

Early life, education, and early career
Bailey was born in Allegheny County to Glenn and Anna Bailey. He was raised in Allegheny and Westmoreland counties. He graduated from Greensburg High School in 1963. He received a BA from the University of Michigan in 1967. He played college football at the guard position for the Michigan Wolverines football team from 1964 to 1966. He played in the 1965 Rose Bowl and North/South All Star Game.

After college, he entered the United States Army, serving with the 82nd and 101st Airborne Divisions in Vietnam. He was awarded the Silver Star, three Bronze Stars, two with the Valor device, one for meritorious achievement, Army Commendation Medal, with "V" for Valor, Air Medal, and a second Army Commendation Medal for meritorious service.

After Vietnam, Bailey, worked at a number of blue-collar jobs, including as a steelworker at J. & L. Steel Corp., during which time he was a member of the United Steelworkers of America. He also graduated from Duquesne University School of Law with a J.D., in 1976, on the G.I. Bill. He was admitted to the Pennsylvania bar the same year.

U.S. House of Representatives (1979–1983)

Elections
In 1978, incumbent Democrat John Dent of Pennsylvania's 21st congressional district decided to retire. Bailey ran and won the Democratic primary with a plurality of 23% in an 11 candidate field. He won the general election with 53% of the vote.

In 1980, he was challenged by two candidates in the primary, but he defeated both of them in April with 60% of the vote. He won re-election to a second term with 68% of the vote.

After redistricting by the state legislature, Bailey's district in 1982 was one of two eliminated as a result of slow-growth in Pennsylvania compared to other states. Most of his district, including his home in Westmoreland County, was merged with the 12th District of fellow Democratic Congressman John Murtha, who had been serving since 1974. Despite the fact that most of the district was represented by Murtha, Bailey decided to run in the newly redrawn Pennsylvania's 12th congressional district. Murtha defeated Bailey in the primary 52%–38%.

Tenure
He was generally considered as a moderate-to-conservative Democrat. In 1979, he sponsored legislation to fund synthetic fuel.

He frequently criticized Democratic President Jimmy Carter. However, when Carter was challenged by liberal U.S. Senator Ted Kennedy, Bailey and most Western Pennsylvania Democrats endorsed Carter. Bailey said "Carter is still the best alternative."

He negotiated for loans for the Wheeling-Pittsburgh Steel company. In 1981, he opposed raising the retirement age. He also voted against spending cuts proposed by Republican President Ronald Reagan and against a Balanced budget amendment.

Committee assignments
United States House Committee on Ways and Means
United States House Committee on Education and Labor
United States House Ethics Committee
United States House Committee on Armed Services

Auditor General of Pennsylvania (1985–1989)
In 1984, Bailey ran for Pennsylvania Auditor General as a Democrat, defeating Republican Susan Shanaman 51%–48%. He was the only Democratic nominee to win statewide that year. During his tenure as Auditor General, Bailey established the first work-site child daycare facility in Pennsylvania government, established minimum education standards for state auditors, and generally modernized auditing procedures.

Legal career (1989–2013)
After leaving the Auditor General office in 1989, Bailey became a full-time attorney, based in Harrisburg, Pennsylvania. His specialties included civil rights. He was also quoted as calling himself, an "equal opportunity suer Lawyers Weekly USA: LOTY" and does take clients litigating with both Democrats and Republicans. On October 2, 2013, the Supreme Court of Pennsylvania suspended Bailey from practice for 5 years

Political campaigns since 1986

1986 U.S. Senate election

Bailey decided to challenge incumbent Republican U.S. Senator Arlen Specter. However, he lost the Democratic primary to U.S. Congressman Bob Edgar 47%–45%.

1988 Auditor General election
Bailey ran for re-election in 1988, but lost to Republican Barbara Hafer, an Allegheny County Commissioner, 49%–48% (difference of 35,618 votes).

1992 Auditor General election
Bailey ran for Auditor General again in 1992. He lost the Democratic primary to State Senator H. Craig Lewis, who won with a plurality of 40% of the vote. Businessman Jack O'Brien ranked second with 27%, Bailey ranked third with 20%, and State Senator Roy C. Afflerbach was last with 12%.

1998 gubernatorial election
In 1998, Bailey ran for Governor of Pennsylvania, seeking the right to challenge incumbent Republican Governor Tom Ridge. Bailey lost the Democratic primary to State Representative Ivan Itkin 49%–39%.

2012 attorney general election
After fourteen years, Bailey decided to run for public office again, running unsuccessfully for Pennsylvania Attorney General as an independent.

Death
Bailey died on March 9, 2020, at age 74.

Notes
Much of the information is taken from the Congressional Biography website and the offline Pennsylvania Manual, volumes 105 (1981) and 108 (1987).

References

 Retrieved on 2008-04-04
Lawyers Weekly
The Political Graveyard

1945 births
2020 deaths
20th-century American politicians
United States Army personnel of the Vietnam War
Burials at Arlington National Cemetery
Duquesne University alumni
Michigan Wolverines football players
Military personnel from Pennsylvania
Democratic Party members of the United States House of Representatives from Pennsylvania
Pennsylvania Auditors General
Pennsylvania lawyers
People from Greensburg, Pennsylvania
Place of death missing
Recipients of the Air Medal
Recipients of the Silver Star
United States Army officers